Chinese American International School (CAIS) is an independent pre-Kindergarten through Grade 8 co-educational Chinese-English dual language immersion school located in San Francisco, California. CAIS offers a Chinese-English dual language immersion curriculum with up to 50% of each school day in Chinese. The school was the first in the United States to have Mandarin immersion education.

CAIS also has international travel programs for current students, high school-aged alumni, and faculty and staff. The school organizes trips to Taipei, Beijing, and Yunnan in the fifth, seventh, and eighth grades, respectively.

History
In 1981, San Francisco Supervisor Carol Ruth Silver searched unsuccessfully for a Mandarin-English school where she could enroll her Taiwanese adopted son. Not finding one in San Francisco she decided to start her own, with the help of deputy district attorney Mimi Luk, Justice Harry Low, Bernard Ivaldi (then Head of French American International School), Maurice Tseng, Yvon d'Argence (then curator of the Asian Art Museum), Joe Chen, Mike Chiu, Donna Furth, Diana Chan, Francisco Hsieh, George Cheng, and Alice Carnes.

In September 1981 the school, then known as the Chinese American Bilingual School, began as a Mandarin-English school with an enrollment of 4 kindergarten students operating in the basement of the French American International School. Shirley Lee, a faculty member of the Chinese department at San Francisco State University joined as founding teacher and principal, and remained head of school until her retirement in 2000. In 1989 the school moved to the Presidio of San Francisco. In 1992, a middle school was added (which moved to a new campus in 2015.) In 1997 CAIS moved into its current main campus at 150 Oak St, the former Caltrans headquarters, in partnership with French American International School.

CAIS has received national recognition for its program. In 1987 the US Dept of Education designated CAIS the "national prototype for Chinese language education in elementary schools." In 2004, CAIS was awarded the Goldman Sachs Prize for Excellence in International Education.

In 2021, CAIS secured a former catholic high school property for $40 Million to be the new campus location.

Accreditations 
 California Association of Independent Schools (CAIS)
 Western Association of Schools and Colleges (WASC)

References

External links 
 Official site of Chinese American International School of San Francisco

Chinese-American culture in San Francisco
Chinese-language education
Education in San Francisco
International schools in San Francisco
Private K–8 schools in California
Educational institutions established in 1981
1981 establishments in California